Conteville is the name or part of the name of several communes in France:

Conteville, Calvados, in the Calvados département
Conteville, Eure, in the Eure département
Conteville, Oise, in the Oise département
Conteville, Seine-Maritime, in the Seine-Maritime département
Conteville, Somme, in the Somme département
Conteville-en-Ternois, in the Pas de Calais département
Conteville-lès-Boulogne, in the Pas de Calais département

See also

Odon de Conteville